Walter Arendt (born 17 January 1925 in Heessen; died 7 March 2005 in Bornheim) was a  German politician of the Social Democratic Party (SPD).

He was Federal Minister of Labour and Social Affairs of Germany from 1969 to 1976. 

Since 1946 he was member of the SPD and member of the German Bundestag from 1961 to 1980.

Biography

Family, education and profession 
Arendt was the son of a miner who died early from pneumoconiosis. This was one of his motives in his later strive to improve the situation of miners by enabling them to receive earlier pension.

External links

 DNB-Catalogue (German)
 Arendt at the archives of the social democratie from the Friedrich-Ebert-Stiftung (Bonn)

1925 births
2005 deaths
Labor ministers (Germany)
Members of the Bundestag for North Rhine-Westphalia
Members of the Bundestag 1976–1980
Members of the Bundestag 1972–1976
Members of the Bundestag 1969–1972
Members of the Bundestag 1965–1969
Members of the Bundestag 1961–1965
Social Affairs ministers of Germany
Grand Crosses with Star and Sash of the Order of Merit of the Federal Republic of Germany
Members of the Bundestag for the Social Democratic Party of Germany